The 1994 Heathrow mortar attacks were a series of homemade mortar bomb attacks targeted at Heathrow Airport carried out by the Provisional IRA.  Over a five-day period, Heathrow was targeted three times (9, 11, and 13 March) by the IRA, which fired 12 mortar rounds. Heathrow was a symbolic target due to its importance to the United Kingdom's economy, and much disruption was caused when areas of the airport were closed over the period due to the IRA attacks. The gravity of the incident was heightened by the fact that Queen Elizabeth II was being flown back to Heathrow by the RAF on 10 March.

Background
The Provisional IRA had first attacked Great Britain in March 1973 with car bombs in London which injured over 200 people. Beginning in October 1974 the IRA launched a sustained bombing campaign in England which lasted until December 1975 when the IRA unit responsible for the campaign was caught after a 6-day siege. Thereafter the IRA launched more sporadic but more spectacular attacks on Britain which generated worldwide publicity like the Hyde Park and Regent's Park bombings (which killed 11 British soldiers, injured dozens of soldiers and civilians and killed 7 horses) and an attempt to kill the then British Prime Minister Margaret Thatcher with the 1984 Brighton bombing.
In September 1989, the IRA launched what became another more sustained bombing campaign on Britain when they bombed Deal barracks, killing 11 bandsmen. In May 1990 a British Army Service Education Centre in Eltham, S London SE9, injuring five people. On 7 February 1991 the IRA carried out mortar attack Downing Street an attempt to assassinate Prime Minister John Major and his War Cabinet, who were meeting to discuss the Gulf War. One of the heavy mortar shells exploded in the back garden of number 10, only yards from the cabinet office. Due to the bomb-proof windows, none of the cabinet were hurt, though four other people received minor injuries, including two police officers. The other two shells overshot Downing Street and landed on a green nearby. In 1992 the IRA launched over 30 attacks on Britain. Unlike the campaign in the 1970s, the 1990s bombing campaign in England was aimed more at economic targets. In April 1992 the IRA exploded two bombs at the Baltic Exchange in the centre of London and killed three people, including a 15-year-old girl. The IRA warning proved to be inadequate and added to the confusion as it mentioned the Stock Exchange, there it was reported in the media that insurance claims amounted to £800 million. The estimated figure for the whole of Northern Ireland since the start of the conflict back in 1969 until then was £615 million. Almost a year later the 1993 Bishopsgate bombing killed one man and injured over 30 people in the explosion. Later estimates put the cost of repair for the Bishopsgate bomb at £350 million (some initial reported estimates were as high as £1 billion).

Attacks

The first Heathrow attack was carried out on 9 March at 6.00 pm. In this attack the IRA fired five Mark-10 mortar rounds into the grounds of Heathrow Airport from a parked car. None of these exploded, and a search by security officers found no signs of further trouble. The Queen was due to arrive at Heathrow the next day being flown by the RAF. Despite being given a one-hour warning that bombs would explode at the airport, police did not close Heathrow's northern runway even after it was targeted by mortar bombs.

The second of the three attacks was carried out on 11 March when the IRA launched a further four mortar rounds from a wooded area. The projectiles again did not explode. The Queen's plane landed while a further search was under way.

In the third and final attack on 13 March, with mortars that again failed to explode landing inside the airport grounds. They had been buried and the launch tubes were missed in previous searches. The airport was closed for two hours afterwards. In a statement issued later that day, the IRA stated their "positive and flexible" attitude to the peace process was "abiding and enduring".

Aftermath
No one was injured in the attacks using what the police called 'home made' devices, but flights were disrupted and Terminal One was closed as bomb disposal experts searched for any remaining devices after each attack.

The shelling of Heathrow was apparently intended to put pressure on the British government to go beyond the Downing Street Declaration. Irish Taioseach Albert Reynolds dubbed the attacks as "political naive", regarding the presumed IRA goal of extracting more concessions. The IRA and Sinn Féin wanted an unequivocal signal from Britain that they would open the way to full scale negotiations, with a defined time span and an open agenda.

This was the last major attack in Britain before the IRA's 1994 ceasefire and until the 1996 Docklands bombing, which ended it.

See also
 1984 Heathrow Airport bombing
 Downing Street mortar attack
 1996 Docklands bombing

References

1994 in London
Aviation accidents and incidents in 1994
Explosions in 1994
Mortar attacks
March 1994 crimes
March 1994 events in the United Kingdom
Provisional IRA bombings in London
Terrorist incidents in the United Kingdom in 1994